was a Japanese academic, historian, author and professor emeritus of the Kyoto University.  He was considered a specialist in modern Japanese history. He was also known as a "progressive historian" and a "Marxist historian."

Early life
Inoue was born in Kochi Prefecture. He studied at the University of Tokyo; and his doctoral thesis was "The History of Modern Reform." He was awarded his Ph.D. in 1936.

Career
In 1954, Inoue joined the faculty of the University of Kyoto as an associate professor at the Institute of Humanities.  In 1961, he was named a professor.  He continued as a member of the Kyoto faculty until his retirement in 1977.

In his early career, Inoue established himself as a Marxist historian, publishing works on such subjects as the Japanese imperial system and buraku.

In his later years, Inoue worked to expand the number of academic exchanges between Japan and China, and led a movement seeking solidarity with Asian nations. He also published works on the subject of the Diaoyu/Senkaku Islands dispute that sided with the Chinese claim.

Inoue received an honorary degree from the Chinese Academy of Social Sciences in 1997.

Inoue's views 
Inoue had published a book criticizing the imperial system; and he continued to be critical of the Japanese emperor throughout his life. In a range of topics, his work was often viewed as controversial due to his active protests and lawsuits against the Japanese government. During the Japanese students riots in 1969, Professor Inoue openly supported the students who were demanding the scrapping of the U.S.-Japan Security Treaty.

Inoue was also very critical of "Japanese militarism" in the Diaoyu/Senkaku Islands dispute with China, and had written a number of books on the subject.

Selected works
In a statistical overview derived from writings by and about Kiyoshi Inoue, OCLC/WorldCat encompasses roughly 100+ works in 200+ publications in 6 languages and 1,000+ library holdings.

Books
 日本女性史 (1948)
 明治維新 (1951)
 天皇制 (1953)
 新版日本の軍国主義 (1953)
 条約改正: 明治の民族問題 (1955)
 日本近代史 (1956)
 日本の歴史 (1963)
 日本帝国主義の形成 (1968)
 釣魚列島的歷史和主權問題 Diaoyu Dao - Li Shi Yu Zhu Quan (1972) 
 Senkaku Letto/Diaoyu Islands - The Historical Treaties (1972) 

Journals
 Japanese Militarism & Diaoyutai (Senkaku) Island - A Japanese Historian's View. Historical Research, February 1972.

See also
History of Japan
Japanese politics

Notes

External links
 Ministry of Foreign Affairs of the People's Republic of China, official spokesman recommending Inoue's 1972 book, Historical Facts of Senkaku Islands/Diaoyu Islands
 GlobalSecurity.org,  Senkaku Islands: References, Links, citing Inoue
 International Boundaries Research Unit (IBRU), Boundary related links, citing Inoue
 Inventory of Conflict and Environment (ICE), Diaoyu Islands Dispute, citing Inoue

20th-century Japanese historians
Japanese communists
Academic staff of Kyoto University
University of Tokyo alumni
People from Kōchi Prefecture
1913 births
2001 deaths
Marxist historians